Matea Čurlinovska (born 6 December 2005) is a Macedonian female handballer for ŽRK Kumanovo and the North Macedonia national team.

She represented the North Macedonia at the 2022 European Women's Handball Championship.

References

External links

2005 births
Living people
People from Prilep